George Christian may refer to:
George Christian (journalist) (1927–2002), journalist and White House press secretary
George Christian (Connecticut Four), librarian who helped fight a gag order provision in the Patriot Act
George Christian, Prince of East Frisia (1634–1665)
George Christian, Landgrave of Hesse-Homburg (1626–1677)
George Llewellyn Christian (1841–1924), Confederate soldier in the American Civil War

See also
 George Christian Darbyshire (1820–1898), English and Australian civil engineer
 George Christensen (disambiguation)